Daniel Bombardieri (born 12 May 1985) is an Italian footballer. He plays as a defender for AlbinoLeffe, having been loaned out, twice, to Pergocrema.

External links
U.C. AlbinoLeffe Official Player Profile

Italian footballers
Serie B players
U.C. AlbinoLeffe players
Sportspeople from the Province of Bergamo
Association football defenders
1985 births
Living people
Footballers from Lombardy